The water python (Liasis fuscus) is a python species found in Australia and Papua New Guinea. No subspecies are currently recognized. Like all other pythons, it is not venomous.

Taxonomy
German naturalist Wilhelm Peters described the water python in 1873. It is also known as the brown water python.Description
Adults average about 6–8 feet (2+ meters) in length, but may reach . Robustly built, it has a long head that is slightly distinct from the neck. The anterior supralabials have thermosensitive pits.

Scalation includes a pair of undivided parietal scales and a single loreal scale on either side of the head. On the body, the dorsal scales number 45-55 at midbody, the ventral scales 270-300, the anal scale is single, with 60-90 paired subcaudal scales.

The color pattern consists of a uniform, iridescent dark blackish brown dorsal color. The belly is a dull to bright yellow that includes the first few rows of dorsal scales. The throat is cream colored, while the upper labials are light gray-brown with dark brown or black spots.

Distribution and habitat
They are found in Australia in the Kimberley district of northern Western Australia from around Broome east through Northern Territory at least as far south as Mataranka to the coast of central Queensland to near Mackay. Also found in the Sir Charles Hardy Islands, on Cornwallis Island in the Torres Strait, and in Papua New Guinea, Western District, in the lower Fly River region at least as far inland as Lake Daviumbo. It can also be found in the southern part of Papuan province of Indonesia. The type locality given is "Port Bowen" (Port Clinton, Queensland, Australia).

The highest population density is reached on the Adelaide River floodplains in the Northern Territory.

Behavior
Despite its common name, many individuals are found far from water for most of the year. They are usually nocturnal, seeking shelter during the day in hollow logs, in riverbank dens, and in vegetation. When surprised, most attempt to flee into any available water.

Feeding
An opportunistic feeder, its diet consists of a variety of vertebrates. However,  on the Adelaide River floodplains, this species preys mainly on dusky rats (Rattus colletti'').

Reproduction
Mating takes place in July–August, which is the middle of the dry season. This is followed by a gestation period of about a month, after which females lay an average of 12 eggs. The hatchlings emerge after 57–61 days of incubation and are each about 30 cm in length.

References

External links
 

fuscus
Reptiles of Western Australia
Snakes of New Guinea
Reptiles described in 1873
Taxa named by Wilhelm Peters
Snakes of Australia